National Highway 332 (NH 332) is a  national highway in India. It is a secondary route of National Highway 32.  NH-332 runs in the state of Tamil Nadu and Puducherry U.T. in India.

Route 
NH332 connects Puducherry city in the union territory of Puducherry with Viluppuram in the state of Tamil Nadu.

Junctions  
 
  Terminal near Pondicherry.
  Terminal near Viluppuram.

See also 
 List of National Highways in India
 List of National Highways in India by state

References

External links 

 NH 332 on OpenStreetMap

National highways in India
National Highways in Tamil Nadu
National Highways in Puducherry